Al-Muzaffar ("the victorious") may refer to:

 Mu'nis al-Khadim (845/6–933), a eunuch and the leading Abbasid general of the early 10th century
 Abd al-Malik al-Muzaffar (975–1008), prime minister (hajib) of the Caliphate of Córdoba from 1004 to his death
 Habbus al-Muzaffar, ruler of the taifa of Granada (1019–1038)
 al-Muzaffar Umar (died 1191), Ayyubid Emir of Hama (1179–1191), viceroy of Egypt (1181–1185) and general under Saladin
 al-Muzaffar Ghazi (died 1247), Ayyubid ruler of Mayyafariqin (1220–1247)
 Mozaffar ad-Din Shah Qajar (1853–1907), fifth Qajar shah of Persia (1896–1907)
 al-Muzaffar Mosque, a mosque in Multan

See also
 Muzaffarids